Dagbjartur Grímsson (30 January 1932 – 2 April 1986) was an Icelandic footballer. He played in two matches for the Iceland national football team in 1957.

References

External links
 

1932 births
1986 deaths
Dagbjartur Grimsson
Dagbjartur Grimsson
Place of birth missing
Association footballers not categorized by position